The Indonesia women's national basketball team is the women's national basketball team of Indonesia. The governing body of the team is the Persatuan Bola Basket Seluruh Indonesia (Indonesian Basketball Association – PERBASI).

In August 2017,  the team won the bronze medal at the 2017 SEA Games women's basketball tournament in the MABA Stadium in Kuala Lumpur.

Competitions

Olympic Games

FIBA Women's Basketball World Cup

FIBA Women's Asia Cup
{| class="wikitable collapsible autocollapse" width=80% style="text-align: center;font-size:90%;"
!colspan=9|Asian Cup Record
|-
!rowspan=2 width=2%|Year
!colspan=4|Division A
!colspan=4|Division B
|-
!width=2%|Position
!width=1%|Pld
!width=1%|W
!width=1%|L
!width=2%|Position
!width=1%|Pld
!width=1%|W
!width=1%|L
|-
| 1965 || rowspan=2 colspan=4| did not qualify ||rowspan=12 colspan=4| No Division B / Level II
|-
| 1968 
|-
| 1970 || 5th place || 9 || 5 || 4 
|-
| 1972 || 4th place || 6 || 1 || 5  
|-
| 1974 || rowspan=2 colspan=4| did not qualify
|-
| 1976 
|-
| 1978 || 7th place || 8 || 2 || 6
|-
| 1980 || 9th place || 5 || 2 || 3
|-
| 1982 || rowspan=2 colspan=4| did not qualify
|-
| 1984 
|-
| 1986 || 10th place || 6 || 0 || 6
|-
| 1988 || rowspan=1 colspan=4|did not qualify
|-
| 1990 || 9th place ||rowspan=1 colspan=3|Level II|| 4th place || 5 || 2 || 3 
|-
| 1992 || rowspan=1 colspan=4|did not qualify || rowspan=1 colspan=4|No Division B / Level II
|-
| 1994 || 11th place || rowspan=1 colspan=3| Level II  || 6th place || 5 || 0 || 5
|-
| 1995 || 12th place || rowspan=1 colspan=3| Level II  || 6th place || 5 || 0 || 5
|-
| 1997 || 11th place || rowspan=1 colspan=3| Level II  || 5th place || 4 || 2 || 2
|-
| 1999 || rowspan=6 colspan=4|did not qualify || rowspan=6 colspan=4|did not qualify
|-
| 2001 
|-
| 2004
|-
| 2005 
|-
| 2007 
|-
| 2009 
|-
| 2011 || 9th place || rowspan=1 colspan=3| Level II  || 3rd place || 5 || 4 || 1
|-
| 2013 || 9th place || rowspan=1 colspan=3| Level II || 3rd place || 5 || 3 || 2
|-
| 2015 ||rowspan=3 colspan=4|did not qualify||rowspan=3 colspan=4|did not qualify
|-
| 2017 
|-
| 2019
|-
| 2021 || 11th place || rowspan=1 colspan=3| Level II || 3rd place || 5 || 3 || 2
|-
| 2023 || colspan=4| To be determined || colspan=4| Level II|-
!Total||  !! 34 !! 10 !! 24 !!   !! 34 !! 14 !! 20
|}

SEABA Championship for Women

Asian Games

Southeast Asian Games

Team
Past rostersScroll down to see more.''
 2019 Southeast Asian Games 

 
 
 
 
 
 
 
 
 
 
 

 2021 Women's Asian Cup

See also 
 Indonesia women's national under-18 basketball team
 Indonesia women's national under-16 basketball team
 Indonesia women's national 3x3 team

External links
Indonesia Basketball Records at FIBA Archive
Asia-basket - Indonesia Women National Team 
Official Website Indonesian Basketball Association "PERBASI"

References

 
Women's national basketball teams